Eugenio Morín (1898 – death unknown) was a Cuban catcher in the Negro leagues and Cuban League in the 1920s. 

A native of Matanzas, Cuba, Morín made his Negro leagues debut in 1921 for the Cuban Stars (West). He played for the club again in 1922, and went on to play for Almendares and Habana of the Cuban League. Morín also played minor league baseball for the Petersburg Goobers and Kinston Eagles of the Virginia League from 1924 to 1926.

References

External links
 and Baseball-Reference Cuban and Black Baseball stats and Seamheads

1898 births
Date of birth missing
Place of death missing
Year of death missing
Almendares (baseball) players
Cuban Stars (West) players
Habana players
Baseball catchers